Richard William DeKorte (March 27, 1936 – March 16, 1975) was a New Jersey Republican member of the New Jersey General Assembly.

He was born in Paterson, New Jersey to John I. and Henrietta DeKorte, and educated at Ramsey High School, Amherst College and the University of Chicago Law School. DeKorte specialized in estate law at the Paterson law firm of Jeffer, Walter, Tierney, DeKorte, Hopkinson & Vogel. He served as a mayor and councilman in his hometown of Franklin Lakes, New Jersey.

DeKorte was elected to the New Jersey General Assembly in 1967 and later elected majority leader with Thomas Kean as speaker. In 1973, DeKorte was appointed counsel to Governor of New Jersey William T. Cahill and subsequently resigned his Assembly seat.

When Cahill lost his bid for re-election as Governor (due to the Watergate scandal's nationwide impact on Republicans)   there were "Transition Meetings" where DeKorte assisted in bringing the governor-elect, Brendan Byrne up to speed. It is said that Byrne was so impressed with the DeKorte during those meetings he made DeKorte Head of the New Jersey State Energy Office (or "Energy Czar" as he was called). DeKorte chaired the New Jersey's United States Bicentennial Commission.

On March 16, 1975, DeKorte died of cancer at his home in Franklin Lakes, New Jersey. During the time between DeKorte being diagnosed, and the time of his death he was visited by former-Governor Cahill, Governor Byrne, (via helicopter landing on nearby McBride Field, amazing neighborhood children) and many other members of the New Jersey political community.

The funeral in the gymnasium at the Most Blessed Sacrament School in Franklin Lakes drew a large crowd. Although his funeral was held at the school, he was not Roman Catholic. In addition to the state police escorting former Governor William Cahill and Governor Byrne, the Franklin Lakes Police Department provided crowd control.

DeKorte's widow Paulette, after a remarriage, changed her name to Paulette Ramsey, and as of 2019 serves as a Councilwoman on the Franklin Lakes Borough Council.

DeKorte sponsoring the legislation that created the Hackensack Meadowlands Development Commission. After DeKorte's death in 1975, the commission headquarters was named Richard W. DeKorte Park in his honor. The commission has been called the New Jersey Meadowlands Commission since the year 2000.

References

1936 births
1975 deaths
Republican Party members of the New Jersey General Assembly
Politicians from Bergen County, New Jersey
Politicians from Paterson, New Jersey
People from Franklin Lakes, New Jersey
Ramsey High School (New Jersey) alumni
Amherst College alumni
University of Chicago Law School alumni
Deaths from cancer in New Jersey
20th-century American politicians